Jack Lendill (2 February 1934) is an English former professional rugby league footballer who played in the 1950s.

Background
Lendill was born in Leeds, West Riding of Yorkshire, England.

Playing career

Challenge Cup Final appearances
Jack Lendill played  in Leeds' 9-7 victory over Barrow in the 1956–57 Challenge Cup Final during the 1956–57 season at Wembley Stadium, London on Saturday 11 May 1957, in front of a crowd of 76,318.

Club career
Jack Lendill made his début for Leeds against Bradford Northern on Saturday 23 January 1954, he scored a game-changing try just before half-time in the 16-10 victory over Halifax during the 1956–57 Challenge Cup quarter-final match at Thrum Hall, Halifax on Saturday 9 March 1957, his last try for Leeds came against Hunslet in 1959.

Genealogical information
Jack Lendill's first marriage to Joan (née Shaw) was registered during first ¼ 1958 in Leeds district. His second marriage was to Valerie (née Thompson) in San Francisco, California, May 1969. Jack Lendill is the older brother of the rugby league footballer who played in the 1950s for Leeds, Peter Lendill (birth registered 10 March 1936 in Leeds South district). Jack currently lives in Leeds, and has one child from his first marriage (Karen A. Lendill (birth registered during second ¼  in Leeds district)), 2 children from his second marriage (Deborah Louise, b.  and Anthony Michael Owen, b. ), and seven grandchildren. He is an avid golfer, and he still can be seen at Headingley Rugby Stadium supporting the Leeds Rhinos.

References

External links
 Search for "Lendill" at rugbyleagueproject.org
 History of Leeds Rugby League Club
 Vote for the greatest number eight prop of all time
 1951-1960: Golden Boy arrives

1934 births
Living people
English rugby league players
Leeds Rhinos players
Rugby league centres
Rugby league five-eighths
Rugby league players from Leeds